The  is a rural, regional railway line of Central Japan Railway Company (JR Central) in Mie Prefecture, Japan, connecting Matsusaka station in Matsusaka and Ise-Okitsu station in Tsu.

Although this line was planned to connect them, the section from Ise-Okitsu to Nabari was never built, due to the prior completion of the present Kintetsu Osaka Line.

History
The section between Matsusaka and Ieki opened in stages between 1929 and 1931, and was extended to Ise-Okitsu in 1935.

Freight services ceased in 1965.

Former connecting lines
 Ise-Kawaguchi station - The Dainippon Railway Co. operated a   gauge line to Hisai on the Kintetsu Nagoya Line between 1925 and 1943.

Service disruptions
Damage from Typhoon Vera closed the line between Ise-Takehara and Ise-Okitsu for two months in 1959.

The entire line was closed for nine months in 1982–83 due to damage caused by Typhoon Bess.

In October 2009, Typhoon Melor struck the area, resulting in over 40 washouts on the section between Ieki and Ise-Okitsu, and the section remained closed for six years after. A rail replacement bus served the section during its closure. The section reopened in March 2016.

During the summer in 2016, some of the KiHa 11 units, used on the line were unavailable due to inspections so KiHa 25 series DMUs were deployed to temporarily replace them, until they returned to service.

Basic data
Operators, distances: 
Central Japan Railway Company (Services and tracks)
Matsusaka — Ise-Okitsu: 43.5 km (27.0 mi)
Stations: 15
Track: Entire line single-tracked
Electrification: None
Railway signalling:
Matsusaka — Ieki: Card signalling
Ieki — Ise-Okitsu: Staff signalling

Service
The Meishō Line is a rural line in the inland of Mie Prefecture. There are eight return workings daily. All trains are Local driver-only services. All trains stop at every station. There are no limited-stop services such as rapids. Services are nearly always formed of single-car KiHa 11 series DMUs. Very occasionally, two cars may be used during events or busy seasons.

Stations
All stations are located in Mie Prefecture.

References

Lines of Central Japan Railway Company
Rail transport in Mie Prefecture
1067 mm gauge railways in Japan